Juan Carlos Varela Rodríguez (born 13 December 1963) is a Panamanian businessman and former politician who served as the President of Panama from 2014 to 2019.  
Varela was Vice President of Panama from 2009 to 2014, and Minister of Foreign Relations from July 2009 to August 2011. He was President of the Panameñistas, the third-largest political party in Panama, from 2006 to 2016.

Varela won the 2014 presidential election with over 39% of the votes, against the Cambio Democrático Party, led by his former political partner Ricardo Martinelli, whose candidate was José Domingo Arias. He was sworn in as president on 1 July 2014.

Early life and education
Born in Panama City to Luis José Varela Arjona and Bexie Esther Rodríguez Pedreschi. Varela is a businessman and entrepreneur, whose family hails from Herrera Province. His paternal grandfather José Varela Blanco emigrated from Bergondo, Galicia in Spain and settled in the district of Pesé, Herrera in Panama. After graduating from Colegio Javier, he attended the Georgia Institute of Technology in the United States, where he graduated with a Bachelor of Science degree in Industrial Engineering in 1985.

Career

In the private sector, Varela has been on the board of his family company since 1986, serving as Executive Vice-President of Varela Hermanos S.A. until 2008.

Varela entered politics in the early 1990s, becoming chief of the Panameñista Party campaign in 1994 and was the Panameñista Party's presidential candidate during the 2009 election; Varela joined forces with his rival, Ricardo Martinelli, as vice-presidential candidate, being sworn in on 1 July 2009 as Vice-President of Panama under President Martinelli. Varela won the 2014 presidential election, winning against the ruling-party candidate José Domingo Arias, who was supported by Cambio Democrático, a party led by outgoing President Ricardo Martinelli. Varela won about 39% of the vote against 32% for Arias. The subject announced he would seek to change the legislative body through constitutional changes.

He is suspected of being involved in the Odebrecht corruption scandal (a Brazilian company that paid bribes to politicians)

Close to the U.S. government on foreign policy issues, in October 2018, following a visit by U.S. Secretary of State Mike Pompeo on "China's predatory economic activity," he canceled five infrastructure projects with Chinese companies.

His popularity is affected by declining economic activity, rising living costs, corruption scandals and the crisis in the health and justice sectors.

Controversies

Juan Carlos Varela was indicted in July 2020 for money laundering in the Odebrecht case.

In October 2021, his name is mentioned in the Pandora Papers.

Personal life

He is the son of José Varela and Beixie née Rodríguez. Varela married Panamanian journalist Lorena Castillo in 1992.

See also
Politics of Panama
Elections in Panama
List of heads of state of Panama

References

External sources

 Vicepresidente de Panamá · Presidencia.gob.pa
 Toma de posesión Juan Carlos Varela
 Biography of Juan Carlos Varela
 Twitter: Juan Carlos Varela
 Facebook: Juan Carlos Varela
 Website: Juan Carlos Varela
Biography by CIDOB

|-

|-

|-

1963 births
Living people
People from Panama City
Georgia Tech alumni
Government ministers of Panama
Presidents of Panama
Vice presidents of Panama
Panameñista Party politicians
Panamanian people of Galician descent
People named in the Pandora Papers
Recipients of the Order pro Merito Melitensi